Zhihong "Jeff" Xia (born 20 September 1962 in Dongtai, Jiangsu, China) is a Chinese-American mathematician.

Education and career

Xia received in 1982 from Nanjing University a bachelor's degree in astronomy and in 1988 a PhD in mathematics from Northwestern University with thesis advisor Donald G. Saari and thesis The Existence of the Non-Collision Singularities. From 1988 to 1990 Xia was an assistant professor at Harvard University and from 1990 to 1994 an associate professor at Georgia Institute of Technology (and Institute Fellow). In 1994 he became a full professor at Northwestern University and since 2000 he has been there the Arthur and Gladys Pancoe Professor of Mathematics.

His research deals with celestial mechanics, dynamical systems, Hamiltonian dynamics, and ergodic theory. In his dissertation he solved the Painlevé conjecture, a long-standing problem posed in 1895 by Paul Painlevé. For the existence proof he constructed an example of five masses, of which four are separated into two pairs which revolve around each other in eccentric elliptical orbits about the z-axis of symmetry, and a fifth mass moves along the z-axis. For selected initial conditions, the fifth mass can be accelerated to an infinite velocity in a finite time interval (without any collision between the bodies involved in the example). The case  was open until 2014, when it was solved by Jinxin Xue. For  Painlevé had proved that the singularities (points of the orbit in which accelerations become infinite in a finite time interval) must be of the collision type. However, Painlevé's proof did not extend to the case .

In 1993 Xia was the inaugural winner of the Blumenthal Award of the American Mathematical Society. From 1989 to 1991 he was a Sloan Fellow. From 1993 to 1998, he received the National Young Investigator Award from the National Science Foundation. In 1995 he received the Monroe H. Martin Prize in Applied Mathematics from the University of Maryland. In 1998 he was an Invited Speaker of the International Congress of Mathematicians in Berlin.

Selected publications

References

20th-century Chinese mathematicians
21st-century Chinese mathematicians
Mathematicians from Jiangsu
20th-century American mathematicians
21st-century American mathematicians
Dynamical systems theorists
Nanjing University alumni
Northwestern University alumni
Northwestern University faculty
1962 births
Living people
People from Dongtai
Educators from Yancheng
Chinese emigrants to the United States